1198 Atlantis, provisional designation , is a rare-type asteroid and eccentric Mars-crosser from the inner regions of the asteroid belt, approximately 3.9 kilometers in diameter. It was discovered on 7 September 1931, by German astronomer Karl Reinmuth at the Heidelberg Observatory in southwest Germany. The asteroid was named after the mythological island of Atlantis.

Orbit 

Atlantis orbits the Sun at a distance of 1.5–3.0 AU once every 3 years and 5 months (1,233 days). Its orbit has an eccentricity of 0.34 and an inclination of 3° with respect to the ecliptic. The asteroids's observation arc begins at Heidelberg one week after its official discovery observation.

Physical characteristics 

In the SMASS classification, Atlantis is a rare L-type asteroid, that belong to the larger complex of stony asteroids.

Rotation period 

In August 2012, a rotational lightcurve of Atlantis was obtained from photometric observations by Italian astronomer Albino Carbognani at the OAVdA Observatory in Italy. Lightcurve analysis gave a rotation period of at least 16 hours with a brightness variation of 0.20 magnitude.

Diameter and albedo 

Atlantis has not been observed by any space-based survey, such as the Infrared Astronomical Satellite IRAS, the Japanese Akari satellite, or the NEOWISE mission of NASA's Wide-field Infrared Survey Explorer. The Collaborative Asteroid Lightcurve Link assumes a standard albedo for stony asteroids of 0.20 and calculates a diameter of 3.92 kilometers based on an absolute magnitude of 14.4.

Naming 

This minor planet was named after the fictional island of Atlantis from Greek mythology, mentioned in some of Plato's works around 360 BC. The greedy and morally bankrupt civilization of Atlantis was punished by the gods with fire and earthquakes that caused the island to sink into the sea. The naming was suggested by astronomer Gustav Stracke, after whom the asteroids  through  were indirectly named by the discoverer.

References

External links 
 Asteroid Lightcurve Database (LCDB), query form (info )
 Dictionary of Minor Planet Names, Google books
 Asteroids and comets rotation curves, CdR – Observatoire de Genève, Raoul Behrend
 Discovery Circumstances: Numbered Minor Planets (1)-(5000) – Minor Planet Center
 
 

001198
Discoveries by Karl Wilhelm Reinmuth
Named minor planets
001198
19310907